This page is a list of novelists born in or associated with the African country of Nigeria.

A
Chris Abani (born 1966)
Chinua Achebe (1930–2013)
Ayobami Adebayo (born 1988)
Abimbola Adelakun
Tomi Adeyemi (born 1993)
Chimamanda Ngozi Adichie (born 1977)
Uwem Akpan (born 1971)
Hauwa Ali (died 1995)
Zaynab Alkali (born 1950)
T. M. Aluko (1918–2010)
Elechi Amadi (1934–2016)
Karen King-Aribisala
Lesley Nneka Arimah (born 1983)
Sefi Atta (born 1964)
Adaeze Atuegwu (born 1977)

B
Rotimi Babatunde
Biyi Bandele (1967–2022)
A. Igoni Barrett (born 1979)
Lindsay Barrett (born 1941)
Simi Bedford
Philip Begho (born 1956)
Natasha Bowen

C
Chin Ce (born 1966)
Teju Cole (born 1975)

D
Abi Daré
Jude Dibia (born 1975)

E
Obi Egbuna (1938–2014)
Cyprian Ekwensi (1921–2007)
Buchi Emecheta (1944–2017)
Rosemary Esehagu (born 1981)

F
Daniel Olorunfemi Fagunwa (1903–1963)
Adebayo Faleti (1921–2017)
Dan Fulani
Bilkisu Funtuwa

G
Abubakar Gimba (1952–2015)

H
Helon Habila (born 1967)

I
Abubakar Adam Ibrahim (born 1979)
Emmanuel Iduma (born 1989)
Jordan Ifueko (born 1993)
Eghosa Imasuen (born 1976)
Uzodinma Iweala (born 1982)
Festus Iyayi (1947–2013)

J
Elnathan John (born 1982)

L
Abimbola Lagunju (born 1960)

M
Oliver Mbamara
Sebastian Okechukwu Mezu (born 1941) 
John Munonye (1929–1999)

N
Okey Ndibe (born 1960)
Uche Nduka (born 1963)
Martina Nwakoby (born 1937)
Nkem Nwankwo (1936–2001)
Flora Nwapa (1931–1993)
Adaobi Tricia Nwaubani (born 1976)
Onyeka Nwelue (born 1988)
Chuma Nwokolo (born 1963)

O
Chigozie Obioma (born 1986)
Timothy Ogene (born 1984)
Gabriel Okara (1921–2019)
Chioma Okereke 
Nnedi Okorafor (born 1974)
Ifeoma Okoye (born 1937)
Chinelo Okparanta (born 1981)
Isidore Okpewho (1941–2016)
Ben Okri (born 1959)
Ukamaka Olisakwe (born 1982)
Simbo Olorunfemi
Kole Omotosho (born 1943)
Yewande Omotoso (born 1980)
Nuzo Onoh (born 1962)
Osonye Tess Onwueme (born 1955)
Ifeoma Onyefulu (born 1959)
E. C. Osondu
Helen Ovbiagele (born 1944)
Kachi A. Ozumba

R
Ola Rotimi (1938–2000)

S
Abidemi Sanusi
Ken Saro-Wiwa (1941–1995)
Mabel Segun (born 1930)
Taiye Selasi (born 1979)
Lola Shoneyin (born 1974)
Wole Soyinka (born 1934)

T
Amos Tutuola (1920–1997)

U
Adaora Lily Ulasi (born 1932)
Rems Umeasiegbu (born 1943)
Chika Unigwe (born 1974)

V
Jumoke Verissimo (born 1979)

See also

 List of Nigerian writers

Noveists
Nigerian